The Mermaid is a 1904 French short silent film by Georges Méliès. It was sold by Méliès's Star Film Company and is numbered 593–595 in its catalogues.

Méliès himself plays the gentleman in the film. The special effects include stage machinery, pyrotechnics, substitution splices, multiple exposures, dissolves, and what reads as a traveling shot (though in fact it is the action wheeling toward the camera, not the reverse). Film critic William B. Parrill suspects this film's visuals influenced Vasili Goncharov's The Water Nymph (1910).

References

External links
 

French black-and-white films
Films directed by Georges Méliès
French silent short films
Films about mermaids
Silent horror films
1900s French films